Jim Holliday (1948 – December 15, 2004) was an American pornographic film director, critic, and historian. He was a founder and previously the honorary historian of the X-Rated Critics Organization.

Holliday was also a member of the AVN Hall of Fame and the XRCO Hall of Fame.

Holliday died on December 15, 2004 in Chatsworth, California, USA due to complications from diabetes.

Books
(1986) Only the best: Jim Holliday's adult video almanac and trivia treasury. Van Nuys, CA: Cal Vista Direct

References

External links
 
 
 

1948 births
2004 deaths
American film critics
American film historians
Place of birth missing
American male non-fiction writers
American pornographic film directors
20th-century American male writers
Deaths from diabetes